Peter O’Fallon is an American television director.

He was born and raised in Colorado, and earned a degree in film studies from the University of Colorado. He began his career in commercials winning several Clio awards.

After directing the independent cult feature film Suicide Kings, starring Christopher Walken and Denis Leary, and co-writing and directing A Rumor of Angels for MGM, starring Vanessa Redgrave and Ray Liotta, O’Fallon directed a stream of television pilots: American Gothic for CBS, That Was Then for ABC, Eureka for Syfy, The Flannerys (2003), Blade for Spike, and The Riches with Eddie Izzard and Minnie Driver, for which O’Fallon also served as executive producer, and The Protector.

O’Fallon also co-created and directed Legit, a TV series starring comedian Jim Jefferies. O’Fallon co-wrote all 26 episodes and directed 24 of them. He directed several episodes (including the pilot) of Agent X for TNT starring Sharon Stone.

He executive produced Agent X, and worked as executive producer and director for Lifetime's pilot Unreal starring Constance Zimmer and Shiri Appleby.

Filmography

References

External links
 

American television directors
American television producers
American television writers
American film directors
Living people
Year of birth missing (living people)
Place of birth missing (living people)
University of Colorado alumni